The second season of Deutschland sucht den Superstar premiered in September 2003 and continued until 13 March 2004. It was won by Elli Erl. The season was co-hosted by Michelle Hunziker and Carsten Spengemann.

Finals

Finalists
(Ages stated at time of contest)

Live show details

Heat 1 (8 October 2003)

Notes
Jessica Houston and Denise Tillmanns advanced to the top 13 of the competition. The other 8 contestants were eliminated.
Michael and Philippe returned for a second chance at the top 13 in the Wildcard Round.

Heat 2 (15 October 2003)

Notes
Judith Burmeister and Ricky Ord advanced to the top 13 of the competition. The other 8 contestants were eliminated.
Bendix, Stefan, Jenny A. and Roger returned for a second chance at the top 13 in the Wildcard Round.

Heat 3 (22 October 2003)

Notes
Yvonne Catterfeld stood in for Michelle Hunziker as co-host on this episode.
Benjamin Martell and Kemi Awosogba advanced to the top 13 of the competition. The other 8 contestants were eliminated.
Gunther returned for a second chance at the top 13 in the Wildcard Round.

Heat 4 (29 October 2003)

Notes
Aida Ilijasevic and Steffen Frommberger advanced to the top 13 of the competition. The other 8 contestants were eliminated.
Constanze and Eni returned for a second chance at the top 13 in the Wildcard Round.

Heat 5 (5 November 2003)

Notes
Elli Erl and Lorenzo Woodard advanced to the top 13 of the competition. The other 8 contestants were eliminated.
Anke returned for a second chance at the top 13 in the Wildcard Round.

Wildcard round (12 November 2003)

Notes
The judges selected Gunther Göbbel and Anke Wagner to move on into the Top 13 of the competition. Philippe Bühler received most votes, and completed the top 13.

Live Show 1 (22 November 2003)
Theme: My Superstar

Live Show 2 (29 November 2003)
Theme: Rock and Pop Ballads

Live Show 3 (13 December 2003)
Theme: My Birth Year

Live Show 4 (20 December 2003)
Theme: Christmas Songs

Live Show 5 (10 January 2004)
Theme: Elton John & Madonna

Live Show 6 (17 January 2004)
Theme: Big Band

Live Show 7 (31 January 2004)
Theme: The 70s

Live Show 8 (7 February 2004)
Theme: Movies

Live Show 9 (14 February 2004)
Theme: Judge's Choice

Live Show 10: Semi-final (21 February 2004)
Theme: The 60s

Live final (13 March 2004)

Releases
DSDS Finalists
Albums: Magic of Music (2003)
Singles: "Believe in Miracles", "Don't Call It Love" (promotional)

Elli Erl
Albums: Shout It Out (2004)
Singles: "This is My Life", "In My Dream", "Not My Type", "Get Up", "Better Than the Rest"

Phillipe Bühler
Singles: "Warum", "Ich kann dich lieben"

Benjamin Martell
Singles: "1st Fan Edition"

Gunther Göbbel
Singles: "Meant 2 Be", "Stand by Me", "Only You", "Girl you know it's true", "Right here waiting for you"

Anke Wagner
Albums: Close to Me (2005)
Singles: "Cool Days, Cool Nights"

Elimination chart

Season 02
2003 German television seasons
2003 in German music
2004 German television seasons
2004 in German music